The men's decathlon event at the 1997 European Athletics U23 Championships was held in Turku, Finland, on 10 and 11 July 1997.

Medalists

Results

Final
10-11 July

Participation
According to an unofficial count, 17 athletes from 13 countries participated in the event.

 (1)
 (2)
 (2)
 (1)
 (2)
 (1)
 (1)
 (1)
 (2)
 (1)
 (1)
 (1)
 (1)

References

Decathlon
Combined events at the European Athletics U23 Championships